Yashawant Dinkar Phadke (Y. D. Phadke Devanagari: यशवंत दिनकर फडके / य. दि. फडके) (3 January 1931 – 11 January 2008) was a historian and a political activist from Maharashtra, India.

Education
Phadke received a Bachelor's degree from Pune University and a Master's degree and doctorate in economics and political science from Mumbai University. His doctoral thesis was titled Sanyukta Maharashtra Chalwal Ani Congress Paksha (Struggle for United Maharashtra and the Congress Party).

Career
For some time, Phadke served as the director of Maharashtra state government's Administrative Institute before starting his long teaching career as a professor of political science at Pune and Mumbai universities. In 1984, Phadke was awarded the Fulbright scholarship to complete his research at Temple University’s Center for Study of Federalism. During 1985-1991, he taught sociology at the Tata Institute of Social Sciences.

During 1991-1993, the Bharatiya Samaj Vidnyan Sanshodhan Parishad awarded Phadke its first Dr. Babasaheb Ambedkar Fellowship. The Asiatic Society in Mumbai conferred on him an honorary membership. (During the 1815-1995 180-year period, the Asiatic Society has awarded this honor only on 122 persons.)

Phadke served for a while as the president of Maharashtra State Board for Culture and Literature. He was the president of the 73rd Marathi Sahitya Sammelan, which was held in Belgaum in year 2000. He headed the Marathi advisory committee at Indian Dnyanpeeth. He was a member of the advisory committee to the central government’s ministry for information and broadcasting.

Authorship
Phadke wrote in English and Marathi on a wide range of historical events and personalities of Maharashtra belonging to the last two centuries.

In English:
 The Constitution of India (Coauthored with R. Sririvasan)
 Senapati Bapat : Portrait of a Revolutionary
 Maharashtra in the 20th Century
 Social Reformers of Maharashtra
 Social Reform Movements in Maharashtra
 Politics and Language
 Women in Maharashtra
 V. K. Chiploonkar

In Marathi:

(Most of his Marathi work remains untranslated into English.)

 Sanshodhak Yashavant Dinkar Phadke (Coauthored with Nilā Upādhye)
 Sansada : Tevha Ani Ata
 Dharma Ani Rajakaran
 Ajakalache Rajakarani	
 Bharatiya Nagarikatva
 Nahi Chira, Nahi Panati
 Jammu-Kashmir: Svayattvata Ki Svatantya?
 Adhunikata Ani Parampara : Ekonisavya Shatakatil Maharashtra (Coauthored with Rajendra Vhora)
 Visavya Shatakatil Maharashtra
 Shivachhatrapati: Itihas Ani Charitra
 Mahatma Phule Gaurava Grantha (Coauthored with Hari Narake)
 Shahu Chatrapati Ani Lokamanya
 Agarkar
 Ketkar Lekh Sangraha (Compilation of Shridhar Venkatesh Ketkar's essays)
 Dr. Ambedakaranche Marekari Arun Sauri
 Ra. Dho.n Karve
 Nathu-Ramayan
 Nyayalayat Madhū Limaye  	
 Annasaheb Laththe
 Drushtadrushta
 Svatantryavir Savarakaranchi Shastrastranchya Waparabaddalachi Bhoomika
 Rakhiwa jJaga Wastusthiti
 Akshar Divali
 Lokamanya Tilak Ani Krantikarak 	
 Kalindichya Tīravarati 	
 Ambeḍkari Chalaval
 Kahani Subhashachandranchi 	
 Shdhata Shodhata 	
 Svatantrya Andolanatil Musalman
 Svatantrya Chalavalitil Shikh
 Lokasabha Nivadnuka : 1952 Te 1999
 Smaranarekha
 Brahmanetar Chalavalitil Dhadadiche Karyakarte Dinakararav Javalakar Samagra Wangmay 	
 Mahatma Phule Samagra Wangmay 	
 Lokmanya Tilak 
 Keshavrao Jedhe
 Shodh Savarkarancha
 Shodh Bal Gopalancha
 Vyakti Ani Vichar
 Krantikarak Va Ambedkari Chalwal

Phadke's last six books from the list above have won  "Marathi Literature State Award" (also known as Maharashtra State Literary Award) .

Shodh Bal Gopalancha - historical work on the lives of Tilak and Agarkar, including their friendship and animosity, was one of the 177 books that readers chose in a poll of the best ever  books written in Marathi.

References

External links
 Books Authored by Y D Phadke
 Books that reference Y D Phadke's work
 Y D Phadke, obituary by Prof. Suhas Palshikar, Published in Economic & Political Weekly
 Movie on life of Dr. B. R. Ambedkar
 Y D Phadke Dead

Marathi people
Writers from Maharashtra
Marathi-language writers
Indian male essayists
1931 births
2008 deaths
People from Solapur
20th-century Indian historians
20th-century Indian essayists
Presidents of the Akhil Bharatiya Marathi Sahitya Sammelan